The 1898 Amateur Hockey Association of Canada season was the twelfth and final season of the league. Each team played 8 games, and Montreal Victorias were again first with an 8–0 record, to retain the Stanley Cup. This was their fourth-straight league championship. The league would dissolve prior to the next season.

League business

Executive 

 J. A. Findlay, Montreal (President)
 J. S. Dunbar, Quebec (1st. Vice-Pres.)
 G. P. Murphy (2nd Vice-Pres.)
 F. Howard Wilson (Sec.-Treasurer)
 W. Snow, E. Hinchy, E. Farwell, E. Blurty, G. Tanguay (Council)

The Ottawa Capitals applied to join the league, but were turned down because they had not won an intermediate-level championship.

Season

Highlights 
The game of February 12, 1898, between Ottawa and the Victorias was notable because Fred Chittick, the regular goalkeeper of Ottawa staged a one-man strike because he had not received his share of complimentary tickets. Ottawa played A. Cope instead and lost 9–5. The fans in attendance heckled the defence pair of Harvey Pulford and Weldy Young, and in response Mr. Young went into the crowd to attack a spectator.

Final standing

Exhibition tours

Shamrocks tour New York 

From February 14 through 19th, the Shamrocks toured New York city, playing teams of the Amateur Hockey League. They played the New York Hockey Club twice and the Brooklyn Skating Club once. The Shamrocks split the two with New York 2–1 and 0–1 at the Lexington Avenue Ice Palace. The series was considered close however in the second game play turned rough and several Montreal players were ejected; Desse Brown (Montreal) and Billy Russell (New York). Benny Phillips of New York would score the only goal and assists were rewarded to DeCasanova and Russell. The Shamrocks also defeated Brooklyn 4–3 at the Clermont Avenue Rink.

Victorias tour New York 
The first game was dubbed by the American media as establishing the amateur international championship, between the top American team, The New York Athletic Club and the top Canadian team the Montreal Victorias.
After the season, the Victorias visited New York, first playing the New York Athletic Club at the St. Nicholas Rink, winning 6–1 on March 4. The game was in attendance of 3000 people. The game was noted as the Victorias were able to 'disarm' their opponents illustrating stealing the puck from the opposing players through stick-handling. Montreal scorers were (2 goals each) Macdougall, Davidson, Drinkwater to Fenwicks single goal 

On March 5, the Victorias defeated the St. Nicholas Skating Club 8–0.

Playoffs 

There were no playoffs as the Victorias won first place exclusively.

Stanley Cup challenges

Victorias vs. Ottawa 
Prior to the season, Victorias would play Ottawa Capitals of the CCHA in a single-elimination game on December 27, 1897, winning 15–2.
It was originally scheduled as the first best-of-three challenge, but the series ended after the first game because the Victorias clearly was the superior team with a 15–2 victory and the Ottawa team withdrew its challenge.

Referee – J. A. Findlay
Umpires – M. J. Polan, A. McKerrow

Source: Ottawa Journal
No challenges were played after the season.

Schedule and results 

† Victorias clinch league championship.

Player statistics

Goaltending averages

Scoring leaders 

Source: Coleman(1966), pp. 41–43

Stanley Cup engraving

1898 Montreal Victorias

See also 
 Stanley Cup Champions
 List of pre-NHL seasons

References

Bibliography

Notes

1898
AHAC